Stefanie Horn (born 9 January 1991 in Bottrop, Germany) is a German-Italian slalom canoeist who competed for Germany from 2006 to 2012. She has represented Italy since 2013. She competed at the 2020 Summer Olympics.

Horn is an athlete of the Gruppo Sportivo della Marina Militare,

Career
She won a silver medal in the Mixed C2 event at the 2017 ICF Canoe Slalom World Championships in Pau together with Niccolò Ferrari. She also won one gold and two silver medals in the K1 event at the European Championships.

Horn competed at two Olympic games. She finished 8th in the K1 event at the 2016 Summer Olympics in Rio de Janeiro and 4th in the K1 event at the 2020 Summer Olympics in Tokyo.

World Cup individual podiums

Personal life
Her older sister Jacqueline represented Germany in canoe slalom. Stefanie is married to Italian slalom canoeist Riccardo De Gennaro. Olympic Italian canoeist Giovanni De Gennaro is her brother-in-law.

References

External links

 
 

1991 births
Living people
German female canoeists
Italian female canoeists
Olympic canoeists of Italy
Canoeists at the 2016 Summer Olympics
Medalists at the ICF Canoe Slalom World Championships
Canoeists of Marina Militare
Canoeists at the 2020 Summer Olympics
People from Bottrop
Sportspeople from Münster (region)